The 1936 Brown Bears football team represented Brown University as an independent during the 1936 college football season. Led by 11th-year head coach Tuss McLaughry, the Bears compiled a record of 3–7.

Schedule

References

Brown
Brown Bears football seasons
Brown Bears football